This is a list of programs broadcast by Warner Bros. Discovery's TNT network.

Current programming

Original programming

Sports programming
TNT, through Warner Bros. Discovery Sports, holds the broadcast rights to the following sports telecasts:
NBA on TNT (1989)
Major League Baseball on TBS (2007; overflow games for the MLB Division Series only, featuring TBS branding)
NCAA Men's Division I Basketball Tournament (2011; preliminary rounds and Team Streams in TBS years)
AEW Rampage (2021)
NHL on TNT (2021)

Acquired programming
Charmed (2001)
Supernatural (2009)
NCIS: New Orleans (2017)
Lucifer (2022)
Cold Case (2005–11, 2022)
Titans (2021)
Harley Quinn (2022)
The Lazarus Project (2023)
Game Theory with Bomani Jones (2023)
True Blood (2023)

Syndicated from TBS
Wipeout (2021 version) (2021)

Former programming

Original programming

Drama
The Lazarus Man (1996)
The New Adventures of Robin Hood (1997–98)
Mortal Kombat: Conquest (1998–99)
Babylon 5 (1998; and four made-for-TV movies)
Crusade (1999)
L.A. Heat (1999)
Bull (2000)
Witchblade (2001–02)
Wanted (2004–05)
The Closer (2005–12)
Saved (2006)
Saving Grace (2007–10)
Heartland (2007)
Leverage (2008–12; moved to Amazon Freevee as Leverage: Redemption)
Raising the Bar (2008–09)
Dark Blue (2009–10)
HawthoRNe (2009–11)
Men of a Certain Age (2009–11)
Trust Me (2009)
Memphis Beat (2010–11)
Rizzoli & Isles (2010–16)
Southland (2010–13; moved from NBC)
Falling Skies (2011–15)
Franklin & Bash (2011–14)
Dallas (2012–14)
Major Crimes (2012–18)
Perception (2012–15)
King & Maxwell (2013)
Mob City (2013)
Monday Mornings (2013)
The Last Ship (2014–18)
Legends (2014–15)
The Librarians (2014–18)
Transporter: The Series (2014–15)
Murder in the First (2014–16)
Agent X (2015)
Proof (2015)
Public Morals (2015)
Animal Kingdom (2016–22)
Good Behavior (2016–17)
Will (2017)
Claws (2017–22)
The Alienist (2018–20)
Snowpiercer (2020–22)

Miniseries
The Mists of Avalon (2001)
The Grid (2003–04)
Salem's Lot (2004)
Into the West (2004–05)
Nightmares & Dreamscapes: From the Stories of Stephen King (2005–06)
The Company (2007)
I Am the Night (2019)

Programming blocks
MonsterVision (1991–2000)
The Rudy and Gogo World Famous Cartoon Show (1995–97)

Telenovelas
El Dandy (2015–17)
Miss Dynamite (2015)

Unscripted
Wedding Day (2009)
The Great Escape (2012)
The Hero (2013)
72 Hours (2013)
Boston's Finest (2013)
Cold Justice (2013; moved to Oxygen)
Marshal Law: Texas (2013)
APB with Troy Dunn (2014)
Inside Job (2014)
On the Menu (2014)
Private Lives of Nashville Wives (2014)
Save Our Business (2014)
Wake Up Call (2014–15)
Cold Justice: Sex Crimes (2015)
Drop the Mic (2019; moved from TBS)
The Joker's Wild (2019; moved from TBS)
Shaq Life (2020)
Rhodes to the Top (2021)

Sports programming
NFL on TNT (1990–97)
Olympics on TNT (1992–98)
Golf on TNT (1995–2019)
WCW Monday Nitro (1995–2001)
Title Night (1998–2000)
Wimbledon (2000–02)
NASCAR on TNT (2001–14)
UEFA Champions League (2018–20) (originally to leave after 2020–21 season)
AEW Dynamite (2019–21; moved to TBS)

Docuseries
Chasing the Cure (2019)
Class Action Park (2021)
Rich & Shameless (2022)

Acquired programming

Scripted

Daktari (1988–92)
How the West Was Won (1988–99)
The Man from U.N.C.L.E (1988–2000)
Medical Center (1988–90)
The Muppet Show (1988–92)
National Velvet (1988–91)
Portrait of America (1988–90)
Then Came Bronson (1988–92)
The Travels of Jaimie McPheeters (1988–91)
My Favorite Martian (1989–90; 1992–95)
The Courtship of Eddie's Father (1989–92)
The Girl from U.N.C.L.E. (1989–95; 1998)
Hondo (1989–99)
Gilligan's Island (1990–92; 1994–2000)
Logan's Run (1990–93)
Dallas (1991–92)
Jericho (1991–93)
Knots Landing (1991–92; 1994–97)
Northwest Passage (1991–93)
CHiPs (1992–2002)
Mayberry R.F.D. (1992)
Charlie's Angels (1993–99)
A Man Called Shenandoah (1993–96)
The Thin Man (1993–94)
Chicago Story (1994–95)
Gavilan (1994–95)
Kung Fu (1994–2001)
The Wild Wild West (1994–2001)
In the Heat of the Night (1995–2006)
Lois & Clark: The New Adventures of Superman (1997–2003)
Starsky & Hutch (1995–99)
Thunder in Paradise (1995–97, 2000–01)
The Adventures of Brisco County, Jr. (1996–2002)
Kung Fu: The Legend Continues (1997–2002)
Lonesome Dove (1997–98)
The Outer Limits (1997)
Spenser: For Hire (1997–98)
Due South (1998–2001)
ER (1998–2010)
The Client (1998–99)
The New Twilight Zone (1998–2002)
Reasonable Doubts (1998–99)
Dark Justice (2000)
Pensacola: Wings of Gold (2000–04)
Psi Factor (2000–02)
The Pretender (2000–05)
Tour of Duty (2000–01)
Law & Order (2001–19)
The Lost World (2001–06)
NYPD Blue (2001–08)
The X-Files (2002–09)
Angel (2003–13)
Judging Amy (2003–07)
Alias (2005–08)
Las Vegas (2005–13)
Without a Trace (2005–09)
Bones (2008–22)
Numb3rs (2009–14)
CSI: NY (2009–19)
The Mentalist (2011–14)
Smallville (2011–15)
Castle (2012–21)
Hawaii Five-0 (2013–19)
Grimm (2015–19)
Arrow (2016–21)
Titans (2021–22)
Million Dollar Wheels (2022)

Children's programming
Most of these programs have since moved to sister channels Cartoon Network or Boomerang, or were aired simultaneously on the former during their TNT runs.

Fraggle Rock (1988–92)
Looney Tunes (1988–98)
Popeye the Sailor (1988–92)
The Pink Panther (1991–96)
Woody Woodpecker (1991–92)
Our Gang (1991–2001)
Captain Planet and the Planeteers (1992–93)
The Jetsons (1992–95)
Snorks (1992)
The Yogi Bear Show (1993–95)
The Moxy Show (November 26, 1993)
Jonny Quest (1994)
Huckleberry Hound (1994)
The New Scooby-Doo Movies (1994–98)
Scooby-Doo, Where Are You! (1994–98)
Ultra Seven (1994–95; 1997–2000)
Garfield and Friends (1995–97)
Tom and Jerry (1995)
The Flintstones (1995–98)
Space Ghost Coast to Coast (February 20, 1995)
What a Cartoon! (February 20, 1995)
Dexter's Laboratory (1996–97)
Jonny Quest: The Real Adventures (1996–98)
Taz-Mania (1996–98)
Star Wars: The Clone Wars (2009)

See also
List of programs broadcast by TBS
List of programs broadcast by Cartoon Network
List of programs broadcast by Adult Swim
List of programs broadcast by Boomerang
List of programs broadcast by Discovery Channel

References

TNT